On December 26, 1920, an African-American man named Wade Thomas was lynched in Jonesboro, Arkansas, by a white mob. The mob seized Thomas from the Jonesboro jail after he allegedly shot local Patrolman Elmer Ragland, and murdered him.

Background
The state of Arkansas had been on edge after the deadly Elaine massacre, in which perhaps as many as 237 Black people were killed between September 30 and October 1, 1919. It was "by far the deadliest racial confrontation in Arkansas history and possibly the bloodiest racial conflict in the history of the United States." On December 25, 1920, police raided a dice game. During the raid gun fire broke out and Patrolman Elmer Ragland was killed. Thomas was later arrested at Hoxie, Arkansas and brought to Jonesboro.

Lynching
Members of the white community quietly assembled in Jonesboro until there was a mob of about 400 people. The police initially attempted to protect Thomas; Jonesboro Police Chief Gus Craig and Mayor Gordon Frierson had barricaded the jail. When the mob broke through the two surrendered Wade Thomas without a struggle because, as Mayor Frierson later recalled, "When the mob opened the door, the first half-a-dozen men standing there were leading citizens — businessmen, leaders of their churches and the community." Other Black prisoners were left alone; only Thomas was seized paraded around the town and then hanged from a telegraph pole near where Ragland was shot. His body was then riddled with bullets.

Aftermath
These race riots were one of several incidents of civil unrest that began in the so-called American Red Summer of 1919. Terrorist attacks on black communities and white oppression in over three dozen cities and counties. In most cases, white mobs attacked African American neighborhoods. In some cases, black community groups resisted the attacks, especially in Chicago and Washington DC. Most deaths occurred in rural areas during events like the Elaine Race Riot in Arkansas, where an estimated 100 to 240 black people and 5 white people were killed. Also in 1919 were the Chicago Race Riot and Washington D.C. race riot which killed 38 and 39 people respectively. Both had many more non-fatal injuries and extensive property damage reaching into the millions of dollars.

See also
African American veterans lynched after WWI

Bibliography 
Notes

References
 

 - Total pages: 368 

  

 
1920 deaths
1920 murders in the United States 
Lynching deaths in Arkansas 
People murdered in Arkansas
1920 riots in the United States
December 1920 events in the United States
Arson in Arkansas 
White American riots in the United States 
History of Arkansas   
1920 in Arkansas
African-American history of Arkansas   
Jonesboro, Arkansas
Racially motivated violence against African Americans
Riots and civil disorder in Arkansas
Red Summer
Deaths from fire in the United States